Platinum & Gold Collection is a 2004 compilation album by The Verve Pipe released by their record company RCA Records in their ongoing Platinum & Gold Collection series. There are no songs from I've Suffered a Head Injury and no new songs overall; the song "Spoonful of Sugar" from Pop Smear is a live version. The album was repackaged in 2007 as Super Hits.

Track listing
"Photograph"
"The Freshmen"
"Hero"
"Never Let You Down"
"Villains"
"Cup of Tea"
"Penny Is Poison"
"Kiss Me Idle"
"La La"
"Happiness Is"
"Colorful"
"Spoonful of Sugar" (live)

References

The Verve Pipe albums
2004 greatest hits albums